Clifford Thomas Morgan (July 21, 1915 – February 12, 1976) was an American psychologist whose research was in the fields of physiological and experimental psychology. He was the author of the 1943 textbook Physiological Psychology, as well as a co-founder of the Psychonomic Society in 1959, of which he served as the first chairman. He also established three academic journals from 1964 to 1966: Psychonomic Science, Psychonomic Monograph Supplements, and Perception & Psychophysics. He went on to give these journals to the Psychonomic Society in 1967. In his honor, the Society for Behavioral Neuroscience and Comparative Psychology, Division 6 of the American Psychological Association, awards the Clifford T. Morgan Distinguished Service to Div. 6 Award.

References

1915 births
1976 deaths
20th-century American psychologists
Experimental psychologists
Maryville College alumni
University of Rochester alumni
Harvard University faculty
Johns Hopkins University faculty
University of Texas at Austin faculty
People from Atlantic County, New Jersey